Sahib Khel is a Pashto-speaking tribe that settled in Khyber Pakhtunkhwa, Pakistan. They are a sub tribe of Gharghashti or ( Gharghakhti) tribe, migrated to the area of Hashtnagar or Ashnaghar (now Charsadda) in early 17th century from Kandahar (Qandahar). They were very small clan. They are descended by Shaib Haq of Momin Khan Dherai.

Notable Sahib Khels 
 Sahib Khan
 Momin Khan
 Molana Muhammad Tayab
 Hakeem Abdul Hameed
 Hakeem Molana Abdur Razaq
 Prfessor Inam Ullah Jan
 Kifayat Ullah Jan
 Dr. Ikram Ullah Jan

References